The Thing That Ate Floyd is a compilation album released in December 1988 by Lookout! Records as a double LP, and in 2002 as a double CD. The album is a compilation of bands from the 924 Gilman St. punk rock scene. It includes bands such as Operation Ivy, No Use for a Name, Crimpshrine and The Mr. T Experience.

Track listing

Disc 1
Skin Flutes - "Straight Edge Song" - 3:23
East Bay Mud - "Win or Lose" - 2:14
Corrupted Morals - "Big Man" - 1:15
Neighborhood Watch - "Gloria" - 2:20
Tommy Rot - "Not One of Mine" - 2:13
Cringer - "Cottleston Pie" - 1:06
Boo! Hiss! Pfftlb! - "Banana Smell Funny Sonata in G" - 2:30
Eyeball - "The Incredibly Blue Moustache of Mr Tinselteeth" - 3:36
Isocracy - "Happy Now" - 1:46
Kamala & The Karnivores - "29 Degrees" - 2:29
Bitch Fight - "On and On" - 1:36
Plaid Retina - "Tied/Tried" - 1:07
Neurosis - "Common Inconsistencies" - 4:01
Complete Disorder - "We Must Do Something Now" - 2:27
Well Hung Monks - "Product of Misdirection" - 3:14
Swollen Boss Toad - "Broken Strings" - 2:28
Vomit Launch - "Life Sucks" - 2:58

Disc 2
Relief Society - "Abandoned Beer Messiah" - 2:38
The Mr. T Experience - "Boredom Zone" - 2:57
Sewer Trout - "Vagina Envy" - 2:32
The Vagrants - "No Way Back" - 2:01
Sweet Baby - "Andorra" - 1:39
Stikky - "Don't Lick My Leg" - 0:19
No Use for a Name - "What!?!" - 2:37
Surrogate Brains - "Extreme Racial Pride" - 2:43
The Lookouts - "Outside" - 3:04
Capitol Punishment - "Jackknifed Rig" - 2:41
Crimpshrine - "Summertime" - 2:40
Spent - "In My Past" - 3:05
Raskul - "Change" - 2:17
Tribe Of Resistance - "Controversy" - 1:41
Nuisance - "Day of Sun" - 2:53
Operation Ivy - "Hangin' Out" - 1:21
Steel Pole Bath Tub - "Bee Sting" - 4:03

See also
 List of punk compilation albums

References

1988 compilation albums
Punk rock compilation albums
Lookout! Records compilation albums
Hardcore punk compilation albums
Ska compilation albums